Aleksandr Andreyevich Markin (10 October 1949 in Magnitogorsk – 2 September 1996 in St. Petersburg in an apartment fire) was a Soviet Russian football player.

He is most notable as the top scorer of the 1976 (autumn) Soviet Top League with 13 goals. He was the first FC Zenit St. Petersburg player to become a top scorer and the only Zenit player to score 4 goals in a league game.

He was also the top scorer in the 1974 season of the Soviet First League with 25 goals.

External links
 

1949 births
People from Magnitogorsk
1996 deaths
Accidental deaths in Russia
Deaths from fire
Soviet footballers
Russian footballers
FC Zenit Saint Petersburg players
FC SKA Rostov-on-Don players
Soviet Top League players
Association football forwards
FC SKA-Khabarovsk players
FC Zvezda Perm players
Sportspeople from Chelyabinsk Oblast